La Dama del collar is a 1949 Argentine film directed by Luis Mottura and starring Amelia Bence.

Cast
 Guillermo Battaglia
 Amelia Bence
 Margarita Canale
 Warly Ceriani as Maitre
 Manuel Collado
 Rodolfo Crespi as Mozo

External links
 

1949 films
1940s Spanish-language films
Argentine black-and-white films
1940s Argentine films